José Luiz Seabra Filho (born 25 January 1974 in Bauru, Brazil), simply known as Zé Luiz, is a naturalized from Trinidad and Tobago football defender.

Career
Zé Luiz signed for W Connection in 2000. His previous clubs include Noroeste and Botafogo-SP.

International career
He made his debut for the Trinidad and Tobago national team in January 2005 in a friendly against Azerbaijan. However, he was unable to feature for Trinidad and Tobago at the 2006 World Cup because he did not gain full citizenship in time.

References

External links

1974 births
Living people
People from Bauru
Naturalized citizens of Trinidad and Tobago
Trinidad and Tobago footballers
Trinidad and Tobago international footballers
Brazilian footballers
Trinidad and Tobago people of Brazilian descent
Brazilian emigrants to Trinidad and Tobago
Esporte Clube Noroeste players
Botafogo Futebol Clube (SP) players
TT Pro League players
W Connection F.C. players
Associação Ferroviária de Esportes players
Association football fullbacks
Footballers from São Paulo (state)